Meena Kotwal is a Dalit journalist, human rights defender, and the founder of The Mooknayak, an online news channel and website focused on social justice for the Dalit minority and marginalised people.

Biography 
Meena attended the Indian Institute of Mass Communication, Delhi (2013-14 batch) and studied radio and television journalism. She also attended Jamia Millia Islamia (JMI) Central University, Delhi, and Babasaheb Bhimrao Ambedkar Central University.

Meena had worked as a broadcast journalist at the Hindi language division of the British Broadcasting Corporation (BBC) in New Delhi, India from September 2017 to July 2019. She also contributes opinion pieces for The Wire, The Print, The Shudra, Youth Ki Awaz and Feminism in India. Her open letter to popular Indian actress Kangana Ranaut was published by The Wire . She has also worked for National Dastak, an online platform which focuses on the stories of marginalised identities.

She resides in Delhi and is known to focus her work around minorities. Her stories cover the issues concerning Dalits (unprivileged community), Muslims and Women. By writing about their plight, she tries to get them justice through her work. She has done some research papers on women and Dalit's issues.

On 25 December 2021, she posted an online video of herself burning the Manusmriti.  She then began to receive death threats and rape threats, and the Delhi Police registed a FIR about the threats. In January 2022, she explained her reasoning for burning the Manusmriti: "The Manusmriti contains a lot of anti-women and anti-Dalit content. Babasaheb Ambedkar had also burned the Manusmriti, on 25 December 1927. Since then, Ambedkarites have been observing the day as Manusmriti Dahan Divas." In February 2022, the UN Special Rapporteur on Human Rights Defenders and others at the UN wrote to the Indian government to express concern about the threats directed at Kotwal.

She founded The Mooknayak in 2021, and by 2023, employs 15 journalists, including 9 full-time. She has described it as "a Dalit-centred newsroom."

Honours and awards
 2020 Indian Institute of Mass Communication Alumni Association (IIMCAA) Award for Developmental Reporting
 2020 Indian Institute of Mass Communication Alumni Association (IIMCAA) Award for Investigative Reporting

External links

References 

Living people
Place of birth missing (living people)
Indian women journalists
Journalists from Delhi
Jamia Millia Islamia alumni
Indian Institute of Mass Communication alumni
1986 births